The Dr. George W. Carr House, also known simply as Carr House, is a historic house at 29 Waterman Street in the College Hill neighborhood of Providence, Rhode Island. The Queen Anne style house was built in 1885 by Edward I. Nickerson and added to the National Register of Historic Places in 1973.

The building was purchased by the Rhode Island School of Design (RISD) in 1916, and has served a variety of roles for the school, most recently as a student cafe named Carr Haus and lounge at RISD. It is one of Providence's early prominent examples of Queen Anne styling. The house is built on a steep slope and located at the corner of a busy intersection of Waterman Street and Benefit Street.

In 1916, the Providence Engineering Society occupied the entire second floor of the building, then owned by RISD. In 1926, artist Frank Convers Mathewson (1862–1941) lived in the Carr House.

See also
National Register of Historic Places listings in Providence, Rhode Island

References

Houses completed in 1885
Houses on the National Register of Historic Places in Rhode Island
Houses in Providence, Rhode Island
Rhode Island School of Design
National Register of Historic Places in Providence, Rhode Island
Historic district contributing properties in Rhode Island
Queen Anne architecture in Rhode Island